Anathallis sanchezii is a species of orchid plant native to Ecuador.

References 

sanchezii
Flora of Ecuador